Haugan is a Norwegian surname which originated as a farm name. The name Haugan  derives from the Old Norse word haugr which can be translated to mean hill, knoll, or mound. Other derivatives include Hauge, Haugen and Haugland, all common Norwegian surnames. Haugan may refer to:

People
Anders Haugan, CEO / Managing Director at Nordea Investment Funds Norway
Bernt B. Haugan (1862–1931), American minister, politician, and temperance leader
Björn Haugan (1942–2009), Norwegian Opera singer
Dag-Are Haugan (b. 1970), Norwegian musician
Finn Haugan (b. 1953), Administrative director of Sparebank 1
Gregory T. Haugan (b. ? ), American author and expert in the field of Work Breakdown Structure
Grethemor Skagseth Haugan (b. 1954), Research leader at Norwegian University of Science and Technology
Gunnar Haugan (1925–2009), Norwegian character actor
H. G. Haugan (1840–1921),  American railroad and banking executive
Helge Alexander Haugan (1847–1909), American banker
Jørgen Haugan (b. 1941), Norwegian author and lecturer
Kjetil Haugan, Director of the Olympic Village during the 1994 Winter Olympics and 1996 Summer Olympics
Marit Haugan ( ? - ? ), Norwegian movie actress
Peter M. Haugan (b. 1958), Norwegian Scientist and Director of the Geophysical Institute, University of Bergen
Randolph Edgar Haugan (1902–1985), American author, editor and publisher
Reidar Rye Haugan (1893–1972),  American newspaper publisher
Solveig Haugan (1901–1953), Norwegian movie actress
Stein Vidar Hagfors Haugan,  Executive Director, Hinode Science Data Centre Europe at University of Oslo

See also
Haugan (disambiguation)

Surnames
Lists of people by surname
Norwegian-language surnames